Leslie Rowson (1903–1977) was a British cinematographer. Rowson collaborated on several films with the director Michael Powell.

Selected filmography
 The Crimson Circle (1929)
 The Man They Couldn't Arrest (1931)
 The Ghost Train (1931)
 Jack's the Boy (1932)
 Lord Babs (1932)
 Leave It to Smith (1933)
 Soldiers of the King (1933)
 The Man from Toronto (1933)
 Road House (1934)
 My Old Dutch (1934)
 The Iron Duke (1934)
 Man of the Moment (1935)
 Royal Cavalcade (1935)
 Her Last Affaire (1936)
 Things Happen at Night (1947)

References

External links
 

1903 births
1977 deaths
British cinematographers
Mass media people from Manchester